Foxidonta is a genus of air-breathing land snails, terrestrial pulmonate gastropod mollusks in the family Trochomorphidae.

Species
Species  within the genus Foxidonta include:
 Foxidonta stevensoni Clench, 1950

References

 Clench, W. J. (1950). A new genus and species of Endodontidae from the Solomon Islands. Revista de la Sociedad Malacologica. 7(2): 59-60
 Bank, R. A. (2017). Classification of the Recent terrestrial Gastropoda of the World. Last update: July 16th, 2017.
 Delsaerdt, A.G.J. (2016). Land snails on the Solomon Islands. Vol. III. Trochomorphidae and systematical review of all other families. Ancona: L'Informatore Piceno. 160 pp, 10 pls.

External links